Elba is an unincorporated community in Cassia County, in the U.S. state of Idaho.

History
Elba was originally called Beecherville, and under the latter name the first permanent settlement was made in 1873. A post office named Elba was established in 1883, and remained in operation until 1996. The present name is a transfer from the island of Elba, in Italy.

Elba's population was 212 in 1909, and was 70 in 1960.

References

Unincorporated communities in Cassia County, Idaho